Acraga serrata is a moth of the family Dalceridae. It is found in the Amazon Basin in Brazil and Peru. The habitat consists of tropical moist forests.

The length of the forewings is 11–13 mm. Adults are orange, but the dorsal hindwings are slightly lighter coloured than the forewings. Furthermore, the ventral surfaces are paler than the dorsal surfaces. Adults are on wing in January, September, November and December.

References

Dalceridae
Moths described in 1994
Moths of South America